This is the list of serving generals in the Pakistan Army. Currently, the Army has 2 Generals, 29 Lieutenant Generals,  and 187 Major Generals.

List of active four-star officers

List of active three-star officers

List of designated and active three-star officers from the Medical Corps

List of designated and active two-star officers

List of designated and active two-star officers from the Medical Corps

Notes

All the names in the list are extracted from open sources (which in turn rely on Pakistan Army's ISPR press releases), therefore the above names might not correlate with the actual current posts of the commanders.

Additionally, the seniority for major-generals is ascertained from the bi-annual military award recipients of Hilal-e-Imtiaz (Military); first on 23 March (Pakistan Day) and then on 14 August (Independence Day). The links from 1999 and onwards are: 1999 March & August , 2001 March & August, 2003 March, 2003 August, 2004 March, 2004 August, 2005 March, 2005 August, 2006 March, 2006 August, 2007 March, 2007 August, 2008 March , 2008 August , 2009 March , 2009 August , 2010 March , 2010 August , 2011 March , 2011 August , 2012 March, 2012 August , 2013 March , 2013 August , 2014 March , 2014 August , 2015 August , 2016 March, 2016 August , and 2017 March.

Similarly, civilian and military awards for outstanding individuals are announced every year on 14 August and an investiture ceremony is held on the following 23 March. The links from 2001 and onwards are: 2001, 2001, 2002, 2003, 2004, 2005, 2006, 2007, 2008, 2009, 2012, 2013, 2014, and 2015.

Information is also gleaned from the wreath-laying ceremonies for the 10 Nishan-e-Haider recipients each year on 6 September (Defence Day). The links from 2005 onwards are: 2005, 2006, 2007, 2008 , 2009 , 2010 , 2011 , 2012 , 2013, and 2014.

Following abbreviations have been used for the respective units/regiments of the officers,

 AC – Armoured Corps
 Arty – Regiment of Artillery
 AD – Army Air Defence
 Engrs – Corps of Engineers
 Sigs – Corps of Signals
 Inf – One of the six Infantry regiments;
 Punjab – Punjab Regiment
 Baloch – Baloch Regiment
 FF – Frontier Force Regiment
 AK – Azad Kashmir Regiment
 Sind – Sind Regiment
 NLI – Northern Light Infantry
 Avn – Army Aviation Corps
 CMI – Corps of Military Intelligence 
 ASC – Army Services Corps 
 Ord – >Ordnance Corps 
 EME – Corps of Electrical and Mechanical Engineers
 AMC – Army Medical Corps

See also
List of serving air marshals of the Pakistan Air Force
List of serving admirals of the Pakistan Navy

References

External links

Pakistan
Generals
Generals
Pakistan Army